Serdar may refer to

 Serdar (given name)
 Serdar (surname)
 SERDAR, a stabilized remote-controlled Ukrainian weapon station
 Serdar (city) in Turkmenistan, the capital of Serdar District
 Serdar (Ottoman rank), a military and noble rank of the Ottoman Empire, the Principality of Montenegro and the Principality of Serbia
 Serdar, Araç, a village in Turkey

See also
Sardar